The 2018 Orlando City SC season was the club's eighth season of existence in Orlando and fourth season in Major League Soccer, the top-flight league in the United States soccer league system. Alongside Major League Soccer, the club also competed in the U.S. Open Cup. The team played its home games at Orlando City Stadium.

Season review

Pre-season

On December 17, 2017, Kaká announced his retirement, after turning down offers from former clubs São Paulo FC and A.C. Milan. With the options of several players declined at the end of the previous season, Orlando City set its sights on the off-season to rebuild its roster. The club began the winter transfer window by acquiring midfielder Sacha Kljestan from the New York Red Bulls in exchange for attacker Carlos Rivas and defender Tommy Redding. During this time, it was announced that Orlando City B had elected to not participate in the 2018 USL season, sparking alarm in regards to the club's youth development and depth. Just a few days later, Paraguayan midfielder Josué Colmán signed with the club as a Young Designated Player.

In early January, Orlando City Stadium played host to two games in the 2018 edition of the Florida Cup. This was followed by the club also hosting the 2018 MLS Combine from January 11 to 17, which resulted in forward Chris Mueller being picked by Orlando City in the MLS SuperDraft.

By mid-January, attention shifted to forward Cyle Larin after images of him undergoing a medical with Beşiktaş J.K. were posted on the Turkish club's Twitter account. While Orlando City was aware of the social media posting, no transfer agreement had been made at that time and the club was preparing to take legal action as Larin was still "under contract with Orlando City through 2019." When training camp officially commenced on January 22, Larin was absent and appeared to be training with Beşiktaş in a video released the following day. A week later, Orlando City announced that they had come to terms with Beşiktaş for the transfer of Larin.

On January 29, it was announced that Orlando City had acquired midfielder Justin Meram from Columbus Crew SC in exchange for $1.05 million in allocation money plus an international roster spot. Further transfers were made throughout January and February, with a total of 13 new players making the move to Orlando. On February 28, center back Jonathan Spector was named the new captain of Orlando City following Kaká's departure.

March
Orlando City began their fourth Major League Soccer campaign on March 3 at home against D.C. United. Despite Joe Bendik making a penalty save early on, D.C. United opened the scoring in the 32nd minute with a Yamil Asad free kick. In the 41st minute, PC was issued a red card and Orlando City played the remainder of the game with 10 men. The Lions maintained pressure throughout the second half and eventually equalized in stoppage time following a forward run by Jonathan Spector that set Stefano Pinho up for his debut goal, securing a point with a 1–1 draw. Orlando remained at home for its second match, falling 2–1 to Minnesota United following a brace by Ethan Finlay. The club then hit the road for its first away match of the season against New York City FC. This marked the first Orlando City appearances for Lamine Sané and Josué Colmán, who both came on as second half subs, as well as Sacha Kljestan. Despite holding a 0–0 scoreline at half, the Lions ended up falling 2–0 from goals by Ismael Tajouri and Maxi Moralez. Following a two-week hiatus, Orlando City returned home to host the New York Red Bulls. After conceding in the seventh minute, City soon struck back with a tap-in goal by Will Johnson. The Red Bulls regained the lead shortly after, but the Lions equalized once again via a Dom Dwyer header to end the half at 2–2. Dwyer opened the second half with a goal that came from a throw-in assist by Mohamed El Monir. The visitors were able to level the scoreline in the 82nd minute, but a shot from Scott Sutter that deflected off of Colmán made its way into the back of the net and secured City all three points in the club's first victory of the 2018 Major League Soccer season.

April

On April 8, the Lions made team history by securing their first win from a 2-goal deficit, with Dwyer scoring the game-winning goal in the 87th minute for a dramatic 3–2 comeback victory against the Portland Timbers. The result also marked the first back-to-back wins for the club since April 29, 2017. With all three goals scored in the final ten minutes, they lead the league with 25 in the last three seasons, reaffirming the nickname "Cardiac Cats." Five days later, Joe Bendik picked up his first clean sheet of the season to go along with four saves, while Dwyer scored his 99th goal in all career caps, for the Lions' first away win of the season: a 2–0 shutout of the Philadelphia Union. The winning streak stretched to four in a 3–2 home victory against the San Jose Earthquakes, courtesy of goals from Mueller, Kljestan, and Dwyer. Both Mueller and Dwyer's goals were milestones: Mueller's strike came 63 seconds into the match, making it the fastest MLS goal in the club's history, and Dwyer's goal marked his 100th career goal in all competitions. Then, in yet another come-from-behind thriller and their fifth straight win to close out the month, Orlando City defeated the Colorado Rapids with a 2–1 scoreline at the high altitude of DSG Park.

May
The first major test of the season comes early, as four of the next five matches for Orlando City come against the top four 2017 Eastern Conference teams: Atlanta United FC, Toronto FC, the Chicago Fire, and New York City FC. A new club record was reached as the "Cardiac Cats" opened the month of May with their sixth straight victory, and fourth when conceding the first goal, in a 3–1 result against Real Salt Lake. Lamine Sané scored his first goal in purple, while Chris Schuler made his debut in the squad's starting 11, against his former team. On May 13, Justin Meram opened his account with a second-half goal against the Five Stripes. However, the Lions' comeback fell short in a 2–1 loss, their second of the season at home. The game was marred by fans throwing trash onto the field in frustration. Orlando City was later criticized by local authorities and news organizations for routinely condemning behavior without taking any significant action to decrease such incidents. The rough patch continued with another 2–1 loss at Toronto FC. A 2–1 defeat at home to the Chicago Fire extended the losing streak to three games to close out the month, as the Lions looked ahead to a 4-game, 12-day road trip with stops in New York, Miami, Vancouver, and Montreal.

June
The losing streak continued into the month of June, as Orlando City fell 3–0 to New York City FC. With Dom Dwyer out due to injury, the Lions have found it difficult to score in their last four matches. The club was able to turn things around in their first match of the 2018 U.S. Open Cup when they defeated NPSL side Miami United FC 3–0 with goals from PC, Stefano Pinho, and Dillon Powers. However, the club's MLS losing streak stretched to five games after the Lions were reduced to 10 men and were outscored 5–2 in Vancouver. The 12-day road trip came to an end in Montreal, where Orlando City suffered its third consecutive three-goal margin defeat. Two days later, the club announced that it had parted ways with head coach Jason Kreis and that assistant coach Bobby Murphy would assume the role of interim coach. Under Bobby's leadership, and changing to a three-back formation that showed much-improved stability in the defense, the Lions were able to eke out a 1-1 win on PKs (4-2), against D.C. United in the Round of 16 in the U.S. Open Cup on June 20. Orlando played their first MLS match following Kreis' departure on June 23, 2018 when they faced Montreal for the second consecutive game. Murphy continued with the three-back formation he had used in the Open Cup four days earlier but Orlando fell to a 2-0 defeat, only registering one shot on target on the way to their seventh consecutive league defeat, a performance Bobby and several of the players apologized for post-game.

On June 29, the club announced that Louisville City FC manager and former Orlando City player-coach James O'Connor would take over as the Lion's new head coach. The day after, Murphy took control of his final game as interim manager prior to O'Connor filling the position permanently. The result was a 4–0 defeat away to Atlanta United.

July
James O'Connor's first game in charge was away at Los Angeles FC, marking the first time Orlando had ever played the new expansion side. The original kick off time was moved to 11:00 p.m. ET to avoid triple-digit temperatures. The team returned to the 4–2–3–1 formation that had been implemented earlier in the season under Jason Kreis but lost 4–1, breaking their three-game scoreless streak but extending the losing streak to nine. On July 14, O'Connor took charge of his first home game with the visit of Toronto FC. Orlando won 2–1 to end their winless streak. It was the first MLS match of the season to not feature Joe Bendik after Earl Edwards Jr. was given the start in goal. Orlando were knocked out of the U.S. Open Cup at the quarterfinals stage on July 18, losing 1–0 away to Philadelphia Union. On July 22, Orlando traveled to Columbus Crew SC where they led for most of the match. However, a penalty call and a controversial lack of VAR led to a game-tying 88th-minute penalty. Columbus would go on to win the game 3–2 in stoppage time. In response, Professional Referee Organization released a statement acknowledging the error and reaffirming that the organization holds all officials "accountable and takes appropriate action when necessary." Orlando returned home to face NYCFC for the third and final time of the year on July 26, falling to a 2–0 defeat and hitting the woodwork four times in the process. Then, despite taking the lead three times, Orlando lost 4–3 away to LA Galaxy on July 29, a game in which Cristian Higuita broke Cyle Larin's club record 89 appearances. Galaxy's Zlatan Ibrahimović notably scored his first MLS hattrick in the game.

August
On August 3, Orlando City traded Justin Meram back to Columbus Crew SC for $750,000 in Targeted Allocation Money and a 2019 international roster slot. The following day, the Lions returned home to face New England Revolution. After trailing by two goals early on, City equalized in the 71st minute. While New England gained the lead five minutes later, the Lions equalized again in stoppage time – resulting in a 3–3 draw. The team ended the month with two losses, both by a one-goal margin, to DC United and Atlanta United. The DC game marked the first time Orlando played at the newly-opened Audi Field.

September 
On September 1, Orlando hosted Philadelphia Union and held them to a 2–2 draw thanks to a Scott Sutter goal in stoppage time. It was the first time Orlando had avoided defeat against the same opponent twice in MLS this season. The following weekend the team lost 1–0 away to Sporting Kansas City as Dom Dwyer returned to face his former team for the first time. The team finished the month winless, losing on two away trips to Sporting Kansas City and Chicago Fire before earning a 0–0 draw at home to Houston Dynamo, with Adam Grinwis securing only the team's second league clean sheet of the season on his debut.

October 
Prior to the team's game against FC Dallas on October 6, Orlando were officially eliminated from playoff contention following Montreal's win over Columbus Crew earlier that day. They went on to lose 2–0. Orlando remained on the road for the next match against New England Revolution which also ended 2–0 and extending the team's scoreless run to five games. On October 17 the team set a new MLS single season record for number of goals conceded when Víctor Rodríguez opened the scoring for Seattle Sounders, the 71st goal Orlando had given up that year. This surpassed the previous total of 70 set by Minnesota United in their inaugural season in 2017. Seattle went on to win 2–1. Orlando's final home game of the season, played on October 21, saw them win only their second game under the stewardship of James O'Connor when Kljestan scored penalty in stoppage time to beat Columbus Crew 2–1.

Decision Day 
On October 28, the final day of the regular season, Orlando traveled to a New York Red Bulls side who were one of two teams with the potential to win the Supporters' Shield. They started the day one point behind Atlanta United but their 1–0 win over Orlando combined with Atlanta's 4–1 defeat against Toronto FC meant they finished top of the standings and lifted the Shield for the third time. Orlando finished the season bottom of the Eastern Conference and, because of Colorado Rapids' decision day win, dropped to 22nd in the Supporters' Shield.

November 
On November 26, 2018, Orlando City parted ways with General Manager Niki Budalić who had been at the club since January 2016 and held the role of GM for two years. The day after, the club announced it had decided not to exercise the contract options of eight players: Joe Bendik, Richie Laryea, Tony Rocha, Chris Schuler, Jonathan Spector, Scott Sutter, Donny Toia and Jose Villarreal. Earl Edwards, Jr. would also be released as a result of his expired contract.

Roster

Staff

Competitions

Friendlies
The pre-season schedule was announced on January 16, 2018, outlining five closed-door pre-season friendlies over the course of February. Training camp began on Monday, January 22, for the first of three training sessions before the club traveled to Jacksonville for a 10-day pre-season training camp at Davis Park. The club then relocated back to its training facility at Sylvan Lake Park. A sixth pre-season friendly was played on February 25 against Nashville SC of the United Soccer League.

Major League Soccer

All times in regular season on Eastern Daylight Time (UTC−04:00) except where otherwise noted.

The opening home match was announced on December 19, 2017, while the remaining MLS schedule was released on January 4, 2018. Outside of the club, there were several changes made throughout the league. The most significant change came via the addition of Los Angeles FC as the 23rd franchise in MLS and 12th member of the Western Conference. Orlando City SC played LAFC for the first time on July 7, 2018.

Results summary

Results

Standings

Eastern Conference table

Overall table

U.S. Open Cup

After the fourth round draw was held on May 24, Orlando City entered the 105th edition of the U.S. Open Cup on the road in South Florida, against Miami FC on June 6.

Squad statistics

Appearances

Starting appearances are listed first, followed by substitute appearances after the + symbol where applicable.

|-
! colspan=10 style=background:#dcdcdc; text-align:center|Goalkeepers

|-
! colspan=10 style=background:#dcdcdc; text-align:center|Defenders

|-
! colspan=10 style=background:#dcdcdc; text-align:center|Midfielders

|-
! colspan=10 style=background:#dcdcdc; text-align:center|Forwards

|-
|colspan="10"|Players who appeared for the club but left during the season:

|}

Goalscorers

Shutouts

Disciplinary record

Player movement
Per Major League Soccer and club policies, terms of the deals do not get disclosed.

MLS SuperDraft picks 
Draft picks are not automatically signed to the team roster. The 2018 draft was held on January 19, 2018. Orlando had one selection.

Transfers in

Loans in

Transfers out

Loans out

Broadcasting
Orlando City were featured on national television 13 times during the 2018 season, while all remaining matches were televised locally on WRDQ. Six of the nationally televised games were shown on ESPN, tied with three other clubs for the most appearances. Additionally, certain matches were streamed live on Twitter following the announcement of a three-year agreement between Major League Soccer and the social networking service. In May 2018, the club announced a deal it had made with YouTube TV in which all of its locally televised matches would be streamed live through the subscription service.

English-language radio was be split between WTKS 104.1 and WYGM 740 AM/96.9 FM/101.1-2 HD for the 2018 season, with WYGM airing 18 regular-season matches and WTKS airing 14 regular-season matches. Spanish-language radio broadcasts were conducted on WDYZ 990 AM.

References

Orlando City SC seasons
o